Lacy J. Davis is a writer and a body image activist. Her memoir, Ink in Water: An Illustrated Memoir (Or, How I Kicked Anorexia's Ass and Embraced Body Positivity) details Davis' struggles with body dysmorphia and dieting.  She co-owns the body positive gym Liberation Barbell, runs the blog Super Strength Health and hosts the Flex Your Heart Radio podcast.

References 

Living people
Year of birth missing (living people)
Place of birth missing (living people)
American memoirists
American activists
American women memoirists
American women podcasters